Ilya Vladimirovich Kuleshin (born 29 August 2000) is a Russian football player who plays for FC Arsenal Tula.

Club career
He made his debut in the Russian Premier League for FC Arsenal Tula on 21 May 2022 in a game against FC Ural Yekaterinburg.

Career statistics

References

External links
 
 
 

2000 births
Sportspeople from Tula, Russia
Living people
Russian footballers
Association football defenders
FC Khimik-Arsenal players
FC Arsenal Tula players
Russian Second League players
Russian Premier League players